Billy McConnell or Bill McConnell may refer to:

 Billy McConnell (field hockey) (born 1956), Northern Irish hockey player
 Billy McConnell (footballer) (1901–1973), Irish footballer
 Billy McConnell (motorcyclist) (born 1986), Australian motorcycle racer
 Bill McConnell (rower) (1927 – mid-1980s), Canadian rower

See also 
 William McConnell (disambiguation)